The squaretail coral grouper (Plectropomus areolatus) is a species of marine ray-finned fish, a grouper from the subfamily Epinephelinae which is part of the family Serranidae, which also includes the anthias and sea basses. They are also known as spotted coral trout or squaretail coral trout and are fast-growing, short-lived, and early-maturing. They are classified as vulnerable, as their populations are decreasing.

Description 
The squaretail coral grouper has a long body, with some specimens reaching  in length, with the females usually larger in length than the males. At first maturity, they are around 36.65 cm long and 771.2 grams.  Its fins are dark brown in color. The dorsal fin contains 7 to 8 spines and 10 to 12 soft rays, while the anal fin has 3 spines and 8 soft rays. They have 1 to 4 canines on the upper jaw. The caudal fin (tail) is truncated, ending in a vertical edge, which gives this fish its name.

Distribution and Habitat 
The squaretail coral grouper is commonly found in the western Pacific, including the waters around Japan, southeastern China, Philippines, Indonesia, and Australia. It is also found in the Indian Ocean, near East Africa. 

They are widely distributed in tropical coral regions, living in shallow lagoonal and seaward coral-rich areas, especially in channels at the reef front.

Squaretail Coral Groupers have small home ranges and many stay close to their aggregation site.  They often co-aggregate with camouflage and brown-marbled groupers.

Reproduction 
The Squaretail Coral Grouper has an early maturity at around 2.8 years and has a relatively brief lifespan at around 10 years. The spawning season is 2-3 months, which falls entirely during January to April. While some regional similarities exist, temperature profiles cannot be used reliably as an indicator of spawning in these species, because the temperature profiles during reproductive periods vary. 

The spawning times occur during new and full moons, which may suggest a linkage to associated high tidal variation and flow to enhance dispersal or retention. Thus, similar to temperature, specific lunar periodicity lacks dependability as an indicator of spawning times and demonstrates the variability within the species for reproduction relative to lunar periodicity. 

When spawning, males typically arrive individually or small groups to establish territory and arrive earlier than female do. The females often come in large schools.

Diet 
The squaretail coral grouper is mainly a piscivore, meaning it eats other fish. They hunt by creating a suction that pulls fish into their mouths and mostly often hunt alone.

Human Impact 
There are several threats to Squaretail coral groupers. The squaretail coral grouper is a food fish, with its consumption most common in southern China. Squaretail coral groupers have a slow maturation and long life span, meaning that they cannot easily replenish their population when overfished. Overfishing is the leading cause to these groupers’ vulnerable status: fishing for the live reef food fish trade. Heavy fishing targets the spawning of Squaretail coral groupers. They are one of the most common member of the Plectropomus genus to be sold in restaurants. 

They are considered artisanal fish and are among the top most desired and in-demand fish species in the fish-trade industry of Hong Kong  and sold at high value. Most targeted fish by nighttime spearfishing or hook and line fishing since they are not active at night and stay in shallow reef areas. They are more abundant than other fish in their aggregation sites, which are the spawning area for these fish and other species, leading them to be more commonly hunted. Sales of fish are limited and there are catch bans during the reproductive seasons. The fish also exist in protected areas. They are also impacted by climate disturbances. There was a decrease in fishing from 1999-2000 but there still was a large volume of imported fish.

Other Information 
Large specimens have been found with very high levels of ciguatoxin in their flesh, and consumption would lead to vomiting and diarrhea. Ciguatoxin is caused by a toxin produced by a microalgae called Gambierdiscus toxicus. From 1997 to 2006, 2 cases were reported in Okinawa, Japan.

References 

IUCN Red List vulnerable species
Plectropomus
Fish of the Pacific Ocean
Fish of Oceania
Fish described in 1830
Taxa named by Eduard Rüppell